Robert Hock (born January 12, 1973) is a Czech-born German former professional ice hockey player who last played with the Hannover Indians of the Oberliga. He previously played for Heilbronner Falken in the DEL2 after seven seasons and captaining the Iserlohn Roosters in the Deutsche Eishockey Liga (DEL).

Career statistics

Regular season and playoffs

International

References

External links

1973 births
Adler Mannheim players
Living people
German ice hockey centres
Hannover Indians players
Hannover Scorpions players
Heilbronner Falken players
Iserlohn Roosters players
Kölner Haie players
SC Riessersee players
People from Šternberk